Lagrezia is a genus of flowering plants belonging to the family Amaranthaceae. It is also within the Amaranthoideae subfamily.

Its native range is southern Mexico, Western Indian Ocean. It is found in Aldabra, the Chagos Archipelago, Comoros, Madagascar, Mauritius, Mexico and the Seychelles.

The genus name of Lagrezia is in honour of Adrien Rose Arnaud Lagrèze-Fossat (1814 or 1818 – 1874), French botanist and lawyer in Moissac. 
It was first described and published in A.P.de Candolle, Prodr. Vol.13 (Issue 2) on page 252 in 1849.

Known species
According to Kew:
Lagrezia ambrensis 
Lagrezia boivinii 
Lagrezia comorensis 
Lagrezia decaryana 
Lagrezia humbertii 
Lagrezia linearifolia 
Lagrezia madagascariensis 
Lagrezia micrantha 
Lagrezia minutiflora 
Lagrezia monosperma 
Lagrezia oligomeroides 
Lagrezia panicnlata 
Lagrezia perrieri 
Lagrezia suessengutbii

References

Amaranthaceae
Amaranthaceae genera
Plants described in 1849
Flora of Mexico
Flora of the Western Indian Ocean